Zhang Pinghua (April 1908 - July 23, 2001), born to a Hakka family in Yanling County, Hunan, China,  was a Chinese politician. His former name was Zhang Chucai.  He joined the Chinese Communist Party in November 1927. He took part in the Northern Expedition and the "Long March" of the Chinese Workers' and Peasants' Red Army.

After 1949, Zhang worked as a local officer in Hubei, Hunan, and Shanxi one after another. After the Cultural Revolution, he was appointed as the Head of the CCP Publicity Department and then the Vice President of the Central Party School of the Chinese Communist Party. Zhang died on July 23, 2001.

References 

1908 births
2001 deaths
Chinese Communist Party politicians from Hunan
Political office-holders in Hunan
Heads of the Publicity Department of the Chinese Communist Party
People's Republic of China politicians from Hunan
People of the Republic of China
Politicians from Zhuzhou
Hakka people